Odontodrassus is a genus of ground spiders that was first described by J.-F. Jézéquel in 1965.

Species
 it contains eight species:
Odontodrassus aphanes (Thorell, 1897) – Seychelles, Myanmar to Japan, New Caledonia, French Polynesia. Introduced to Jamaica
Odontodrassus aravaensis Levy, 1999 – Israel, Egypt
Odontodrassus bicolor Jézéquel, 1965 – Ivory Coast
Odontodrassus hondoensis (Saito, 1939) – Russia (Far East), China, Korea, Japan
Odontodrassus mundulus (O. Pickard-Cambridge, 1872) – Tunisia to Israel, Karakorum
Odontodrassus muralis Deeleman-Reinhold, 2001 – Thailand, China, Indonesia (Sulawesi, Lombok)
Odontodrassus nigritibialis Jézéquel, 1965 (type) – Ivory Coast
Odontodrassus yunnanensis (Schenkel, 1963) – China

References

Araneomorphae genera
Gnaphosidae
Spiders of Africa
Spiders of Asia